Markus Fothen (born 9 September 1981 in Kaarst) is a retired German road racing cyclist, who rode as a professional between 2004 and 2013.

In 2003 Fothen won the under-23 World Championship time trial in Hamilton, Canada. He completed the 30.8 km course in 38:35.29, beating his nearest rival by nearly 20 seconds.

During 2006 Tour de France, Fothen held the white jersey as leader of the young rider classification for 13 stages, losing it to Damiano Cunego on the 17th stage.  He finished the Tour 38 seconds behind Cunego.

Major results

2002
 1st  Overall Ronde de l'Isard
1st Stage 2
2003
 1st  Time trial, UCI Road World Under–23 Championships
 1st  Time trial, UEC European Under–23 Road Championships
 2nd Overall Ronde de l'Isard
2004
 1st GP Triberg-Schwarzwald
 4th Overall Regio-Tour
2005
 2nd Overall Circuit de la Sarthe
2006
 1st LuK Challenge Chrono, time trial duo (with Sebastian Lang)
2007
 1st Stage 1 Tour de Romandie
2008
 2nd Overall Regio-Tour
1st Stage 5
 4th Overall Tirreno–Adriatico
 8th Overall Tour de Suisse
1st Stage 5
 8th Overall Bayern–Rundfahrt
 10th Overall Volta ao Algarve
2010
 10th Overall Tour Down Under
2011
 7th Overall Oberösterreichrundfahrt
 8th Overall Tour d'Azerbaïdjan
2012
 8th Overall Szlakiem Grodów Piastowskich

References

External links
 Official website
 Palmares on CyclingBase (French)

1981 births
Living people
People from Rhein-Kreis Neuss
Sportspeople from Düsseldorf (region)
German male cyclists
Tour de Suisse stage winners
Cyclists from North Rhine-Westphalia